Kurt Sepp (born 14 September 1935) is a German ice hockey player. He competed in the men's tournaments at the 1956 Winter Olympics, the 1960 Winter Olympics and the 1964 Winter Olympics.

References

External links
 

1935 births
Living people
Olympic ice hockey players of Germany
Olympic ice hockey players of the United Team of Germany
Ice hockey players at the 1956 Winter Olympics
Ice hockey players at the 1960 Winter Olympics
Ice hockey players at the 1964 Winter Olympics
Sportspeople from Füssen